"She's Got It" is a 1956 song by Little Richard, written by John Marascalco and Little Richard. It was originally called "I Got It" (and Richard had also recorded a version with that title), but the lyrics were rewritten for the film The Girl Can't Help It. The song was first issued as single in October, reaching No. 9 on Billboard's R&B chart, and was then included on Richard's debut album on Specialty Records Here's Little Richard. The number was sung on film by Little Richard while Jayne Mansfield's character went to the powder room in The Girl Can't Help It.

References

1956 songshttps://en.wikipedia.org/w/index.php?title=She%27s_Got_It&action=edit
Little Richard songshttps://en.wikipedia.org/w/index.php?title=She%27s_Got_It&action=edit